Maryland Route 109 (MD 109) is a state highway in the U.S. state of Maryland. The highway runs  from MD 107 in Poolesville north to MD 355 in Hyattstown. MD 109 connects the northwestern Montgomery County communities of Poolesville, Beallsville, Barnesville, and Hyattstown with each other and with Interstate 270 (I-270). The highway was built between Beallsville and Barnesville by 1910. MD 109 was extended to Poolesville in the early 1920s and to Comus in the late 1920s. The route was extended north through its early 1950s interchange with I-270 to Hyattstown in the late 1950s.

Route description

MD 109 begins at the intersection of Elgin Road and Fisher Avenue in the town of Poolesville. The intersection also serves as the western terminus of MD 107, which heads east along Fisher Avenue through the Poolesville Historic District. MD 109 heads north along two-lane undivided Elgin Road, which becomes Beallsville Road when it leaves the town. The highway passes by the historic homes Chiswell's Inheritance and Dowden's Luck before passing through the village of Beallsville, where the route intersects MD 28 (Darnestown Road). MD 109 continues northeast and passes under CSX's Metropolitan Subdivision railroad line south of Barnesville; next to the railroad bridge is the Barnesville station serving MARC's Brunswick Line. The highway continues through the town of Barnesville, where the route turns east onto Barnesville Road then north onto Old Hundred Road. MD 109 crosses a branch of the Little Monocacy River and intersects Comus Road in the hamlet of Comus; Comus Road leads west to Sugarloaf Mountain. The highway veers east at the Montgomery–Frederick county line, which the route briefly follows, and meets I-270 (Eisenhower Memorial Highway) at a partial cloverleaf interchange. MD 109 closely parallels Little Bennett Creek and crosses it within the interchange. The highway reaches its eastern terminus at MD 355 (Frederick Road) in the village of Hyattstown, a short distance south of MD 355's intersection with MD 75 (Green Valley Road) on the opposite side of the county line.

History

The first segment of the highway that became MD 109 was constructed as a macadam road by Montgomery County with state aid by 1910. The modern road was built from the southern edge of Beallsville to the center of Barnesville. As of 1910, the improved road was proposed to be extended to Poolesville; however, the Beallsville–Poolesville segment of the macadam road was not completed until 1923. The highway was extended north from Barnesville to Comus in two sections. The first segment was built in 1925 and 1926; the road was completed to Comus in 1927 and 1928. A disjoint segment of MD 109 was built as a concrete road along Westerly Road between Edwards Ferry Road and Willard Road on the southern edge of Poolesville in 1929 and 1930. The county highway between MD 95 at Comus and U.S. Route 240 (now MD 355) at Hyattstown was reconstructed as a macadam road by the Maryland State Roads Commission between 1936 and 1938. MD 109's bridge across Little Bennett Creek and its interchange with Washington National Pike (now I-270) were constructed between 1951 and 1953. The disjoint segment of MD 109 south of Poolesville was transferred to county maintenance in 1957. MD 109 was extended from Comus to Hyattstown in 1960.

Junction list

See also

References

External links

MDRoads: MD 109

109
Maryland Route 109